Euan Angus Ashley is a Scottish physician, scientist, author, and founder based  at Stanford University in California where he is Associate Dean in the School of Medicine and holds the Roger and Joelle Burnell Chair of Genomics and Precision Health. He is known for helping establish the field of medical genomics.

Education and early life 
Ashley was born and raised in the West of Scotland and attended Kelvinside Academy in Glasgow. As a teenager, he programmed computers and read popular science books on genetics. He studied Physiology and Medicine at the University of Glasgow graduating with 1st class Honors. He completed residency training at the Oxford Deanery and received his Doctorate (DPhil) from the University of Oxford (Christ Church College). At Stanford University in California, he completed post-doctoral research and specialized training in cardiology, joining the faculty in 2006. He was appointed Associate Dean in 2020.

Research

Genomics 
Ashley is best known for his study of the human genome. In 2009, he led the team that carried out the first medical interpretation of a human genome. The work published in The Lancet laid out a general framework for the medical analysis of a complete human genome and applied this framework to the genome of his Stanford colleague, Stephen Quake. Quake had invented a technology to sequence his own genome becoming the fifth individual in the world to be sequenced. The landmark medical analysis was reported internationally in news media internationally and was later featured in the Smithsonian museum.

In 2010, Ashley's team carried out the first whole genome molecular autopsy generating data from the same Helicos sequencing technology of post-mortem cardiac tissue from a patient who died suddenly at a young age of presumed cardiac cause.

In 2011, his team developed a framework for family-based medical genome analysis. The West family were the first family to have their genomes sequenced and were four of the ten individuals sequenced as part of Illumina’s personal genome sequencing project. Other individuals in this first group of ten included Illumina CEO Jay Flatley and the actress Glenn Close. The computational tools developed by Ashley’s team included inheritance tools for mendelian diagnosis in trios and quartets, family based polygenic risk scores, whole genome phasing, HLA typing, and automated star-allele calling for pharmacogenomics.

Over the following years, Ashley’s team helped establish genome sequencing as a fundamental tool for diagnosis in clinical medicine. In 2014, they reported in the Journal of the American Medical Association a study of genome sequencing in primary care, demonstrating early detection of pathogenic variations in the breast and ovarian cancer gene BRCA2, and delivering tools for cardiometabolic polygenic risk scoring, and pharmacogenomics. This work also introduced quality-coverage metrics. Ashley was interviewed for NPR’s Morning Edition.

In 2017, Ashley’s team made the first medical diagnosis using long read sequencing in a patient with Carney complex whose targeted Sanger sequencing and short read whole genome sequencing had been unrevealing. Developing a pipeline for clinical diagnosis based on aligning, variant calling and filtering Pacific Biosciences SMRT sequencing data, the team identified a previously unrecognized 2 kilobase deletion in PRKAR1A, the gene responsible for Carney complex.

In 2018, as the first co-chair of the steering committee of the Undiagnosed Diseases Network (UDN)  Ashley led the network’s analysis published in the New England Journal of Medicine that reported an overall diagnosis rate of 35%, estimated significant cost savings from early application, and defined 31 new medical syndromes. This was reported widely including on CBS This Morning, NPR’s Morning Edition, and the New York Times where it featured in a segment titled This Week in Good News.

In 2022 Ashley and his research team developed ultra-rapid nanopore genome sequencing for critically ill patients. Published in the New England Journal of Medicine and Nature Biotechnology, the team showed that a genetic diagnosis from whole genome sequencing was possible in as little as 7 hours and 18 minutes. This achievement was recognized by the National Institute for Standards and Technology as well as by Guinness World Records who awarded the team a new record for “fastest DNA sequencing technique.” Ashley appeared on NBC Evening News to discuss the findings.

Cardiovascular science 
Ashley’s group has also contributed to the foundational science underlying the development of heart transplant donation after cardiac death (DCD) much of that work performed in the same building at Stanford in which heart transplantation was first developed by Norman Shumway.

Awards and Honors 
Ashley is a recipient of the National Innovation Award from the American Heart Association (AHA) as well as the National Institutes of Health (NIH) Director's New Innovator Award. In 2017, he was recognized by the Obama White House for contributions to personalized and precision medicine. In 2019, he was awarded the American Heart Association Medal of Honor for Genomics and Precision Medicine. In 2021, he became the first holder of the Roger and Joelle Burnell Chair in Genomics and Precision Health at Stanford University.

Scientific publications 
Ashley has co-authored over 400 peer reviewed publications.

Books

Cardiology Explained 
In 2004, Ashley published the textbook Cardiology Explained along with co-author Josef Niebauer (Remedica, London). According to the publisher’s notes, the title “…explains the basic physiology and pathophysiologic mechanisms of cardiovascular disease in a straightforward and diagrammatic manner, gives guidelines as to when referral is appropriate, and, uniquely, explains what the specialist is likely to do.”

The Genome Odyssey 
Ashley released the non-fiction title The Genome Odyssey: Medical Mysteries and the Incredible Quest to Solve Them  on February 23, 2021, with Celadon Books, a division of Macmillan Publishers. The book features stories of patients and families from Ashley’s medical practice and walks through the science underlying those diseases, shining a spotlight on some of the scientists. New York Times best-selling author Abraham Verghese remarked that The Genome Odyssey was “destined to be a landmark narrative in the canon of modern science.” The Pulitzer prize winning author Siddartha Muhkerjee wrote that “Dr Ashley, one of the pioneers of gene sequencing technologies, writes with authority, elegance and simplicity.” The Wall Street Journal described The Genome Odyssey as an “impassioned, firsthand account of the effort to bring genomic data into clinical practice.”

Media 
Ashley has appeared on National Public Radio in the United States as well as the BBC radio, Japanese and Indian national television, and NBC Evening News. His work has been covered in print by The New York Times, The Wall Street Journal, The Guardian, The Times of London, The Economist, The Daily Telegraph, Technology Review, and others. His work with the Undiagnosed Diseases Network was covered by National Public Radio and The New York Times.

Startup companies 
Ashley is co-founder of multiple companies.

Personalis 
In 2012, Ashley co-founded Personalis, a genome-scale diagnostics company with Stanford colleagues Russ Altman, Atul Butte, Mike Snyder and businessman John West. West was the former CEO of Solexa and managed the sale of its core business to Illumina, Inc. In a 2021 earnings call, CEO John West stated that Personalis has sequenced more genomes than any other private company in the US. The company focuses on cancer diagnostics.

Deepcell 
Ashley co-founded Deepcell along with Maddison Masaeli (a former post doc in his lab) and Mahyar Salek (a computer scientist). Deepcell develops imaging and microfluidics platforms that use artificial intelligence to identify and isolate viable cells based on morphological distinctions.

Svexa 
Ashley is co-founder and chairman of the board at Silicon Valley Exercise Analytics (Svexa), a sports intelligence company that combines physical, subjective and biological data to offer optimized training, performance and recovery recommendations for athletes and teams. He co-founded Svexa with Mikael Mattson, a Swedish physiologist who completed part of his PhD in Ashley’s lab, Daryl Waggott who worked as a computational biologist in Ashley’s lab, and Filip Larsen, a longtime collaborator of Mattson.

Company boards

AstraZeneca 
Ashley was appointed as a Non-Executive Director of the pharmaceutical company AstraZeneca in October 2020.  In July 2021, the company acquired Boston-based rare disease company Alexion in a $40 billion deal. During the pandemic, the company licensed a COVID vaccine from the University of Oxford and distributed more than 3 billion doses of the vaccine globally mostly to low- and moderate-income countries. According to company statements, close to 2 billion doses were distributed at cost.

Svexa 
Ashley is Chairman of the Board of the sports intelligence company Svexa.

Music 
Ashley learned jazz saxophone as a teenager and joined Scotland’s regional youth jazz orchestra including tours to the Montreux Jazz Festival, Poland and the USA. Forming a jazz saxophone quartet with members of its saxophone section, The Hung Drawn Quartet featured Ashley, Raymond MacDonald, Graeme Wilson and Allon Beauvoisin and performed a mix of original compositions and arrangements of jazz standards. They released two albums (Cookin' with the HDQ and A Train in the Distance) appeared multiple times on BBC Radio and contributed an arrangement of Charlie Mingus’ Haitian Fight Song to the David Byrne-produced soundtrack for the movie Young Adam featuring Ewan McGregor, Tilda Swinton, and Emily Mortimer. They toured in the US (Philadelphia, New York) and Ontario, Canada in 1994. Ashley also performed in duo and quartet format at the Glasgow International Jazz Festival with Malcolm Finlay, Stuart Brown and others as part of the group Universal.

While at Oxford University, Ashley directed the Oxford University Jazz Orchestra a period of tenure that included band tours to the Glasgow International Jazz Festival, honors at the BBC big band competition, and the release of the live album Know Where you Are with bebop legend Peter King.

During this time, Ashley also acted as soloist for a performance of the Glazounov Saxophone Concerto by the Radcliffe Orchestra in Oxford.

In California, Ashley has performed with jazz group The Jazz Factory and with an Oakland-based Afro-Peruvian jazz collective.

Personal life 
Ashley lives in Stanford, California with his wife, Fiona, and their three children. According to his Stanford biography, he is also a private pilot.

References

External links 
 Lab homepage at Stanford University
 Profile at Stanford University

Stanford University School of Medicine faculty
Living people
Alumni of the University of Glasgow
Alumni of Christ Church, Oxford
People from Stanford, California
Year of birth missing (living people)